Alexander Bruce, 2nd Earl of Kincardine FRS (1629–1681) was a Scottish inventor, politician, judge and freemason, who collaborated with Christiaan Huygens in developing a marine pendulum clock.

His grandfather, Sir George Bruce had built up a fortune in coal-mining and salt-production, building Culross Palace in Fife in 1597.

In 1659 he married Veronica, a sister of Cornelis van Aerssen van Sommelsdijck and delivered stone or marble of the townhall of Amsterdam. On 20 June 1667 Bruce is listed as a Treasurer of Scotland.  In the same year he was an Extraordinary Lord of Session.

Bruce was one those making up the 1660 committee of 12 that led to formation of the Royal Society of London, and he conducted extensive correspondence with fellow freemason Sir Robert Moray. These letters are the main source of biographical information on Bruce.

See also
 Sir William Bruce, 1st Baronet, of Balcaskie, Alexander's cousin and business partner

References

1629 births
1681 deaths
2
17th-century Scottish scientists
People from Fife
Scottish inventors
Members of the Privy Council of Scotland
Freemasonry in Scotland
Bruce, Alexander
Scottish Episcopalians
Commissioners of the Treasury of Scotland
Extraordinary Lords of Session